Xuan Jiang  (730–690 BC), was the Duchess consort of Duke Xuan of Wey (r. 718–700).

She was the daughter of the Marquis of Qi of the Jiang clan. She married Duke Xuan of Wey and became the mother of Duke Hui of Wey (r. 699–697).

She was initially engaged to Crown prince Jizi, but her future stepfather instead chose to marry her himself.  She is known for arranging the murder of her stepson Jizi, with the support of her younger son, by hiring robbers to attack him on the road.   Initially, her own older son was killed in error for having disguised as his brother in order to protect him, but she succeeded on her second attempt.

When her son succeeded his father, she was convinced by her father to enter into a relationship with her stepson prince Shou Zhao Bo of Wey, which whom she had five children.

Legacy
She is included in the "Biographies of Pernicious and Depraved Women" of the Biographies of Eminent women (Lienü zhuan).

References 

730 BC births
690 BC deaths
8th-century BC Chinese women
8th-century BC Chinese people
7th-century BC Chinese women
7th-century BC Chinese people
Duchesses